Luís "Dinga" Reis (born 1 October 1980) is a Portuguese Muay Thai kickboxer of Cape Verdian descent fighting out of Lisbon, Portugal for the Olival Gym.  He is a K-1 MAX and It's Showtime regional champion who has also won medals for Portugal at amateur level.  His older brother José Reis is also a respected kickboxer.

Biography and career 

After a relatively successful amateur career where he had won a number of Iberian championships and several podium finishes at various W.A.K.O world and European championships, Luis made his K-1 debut in 2004.  In a rather bizarre tournament appearance he made it to the semi finals at the MAX event in Lisbon as an injury replacement only to face his older brother José who showed little brotherly love by promptly stopped him in the second round.  Luis had more success at the next regional MAX event across the border in Spain, stopping his two opponents before losing to home fighter Abrahan Roqueñi in the final.

After his MAX appearances Luis joined the (then) fledgling Thai & Kickbox SuperLeague in 2005 but had little success in his two matches with the promotion losing both by decision.  A return to K-1 MAX in 2006 resulted in a tournament victory in his hometown of Lisbon although the regional win would not mean a place at that year's K-1 MAX final.  He encountered the same issue later that year with the It's Showtime organization winning their 75MAX tournament in Portugal but failing to be invited to the final to be held in the Netherlands the following year.  In 2009 he won another tournament in his home town, this time winning the World Kickboxing Network (W.K.N.) eight man K-1 rules tournament.

On December 15, 2012, he lost to the eventual tournament winner Karim Ghajji on points in the semi-finals of the WKN 75 kg Full Contact European Grand Prix at Full Night 6 in Agde, France.

He lost to Bakari Tounkara on points at FK-ONE in Paris, France, on April 20, 2013.

Titles 

Professional
2009 W.K.N. Grand Prix Portugal K-1 rules tournament -74 kg
2007 It's Showtime 75MAX Trophy Portugal tournament champion -75 kg
2006 K-1 MAX Portugal tournament champion -70 kg
2004 K-1 MAX Spain tournament runner up -70 kg

Amateur
2006 W.A.K.O. European Championships in Lisbon, Portugal  -71 kg (Full-Contact) 
2004 Iberian Kickboxing Championships 
2003 W.A.K.O. World Championships in Yalta, Ukraine  (Low-Kick)
2003 Iberian Kickboxing Championships 
2002 W.A.K.O. European Championships in Jesolo, Italy   -67 kg (Low-Kick)
2001 W.A.K.O. World Championships in Belgrade, Serbia & Montenegro  -67 kg (Low-Kick)
2001 Iberian Kickboxing Championships

Professional kickboxing record

|-
|-  bgcolor="#FFBBBB"
| 2013-04-20 || Loss ||align=left| Bakari Tounkara || FK-ONE || Paris, France ||Decision || 3||3:00
|-  bgcolor="#FFBBBB"
| 2012-12-15 || Loss ||align=left| Karim Ghajji || Full Night 6, 2012 WKN 75 kg Full Contact European Grand Prix Semi Finals || Agde, France || Decision || 3 || 3:00
|-
|-  bgcolor="#CCFFCC"
| 2009-07-04 || Win ||align=left| José Veiga || W.K.N. Grand Prix Portugal, Final|| Lisbon, Portugal || Ext.R Decision (Unanimous) || 4 || 3:00
|-
! style=background:white colspan=9 |
|-
|-  bgcolor="#CCFFCC"
| 2009-07-04 || Win ||align=left| Fabio Texeira || W.K.N. Grand Prix Portugal, Semi Final || Lisbon, Portugal || TKO (Doc Stop) || 1 ||  
|-
|-  bgcolor="#CCFFCC"
| 2009-07-04 || Win ||align=left| Hicham Bettaini || W.K.N. Grand Prix Portugal, Quarter Final || Lisbon, Portugal || KO || 1 || 
|-
|-  bgcolor="#CCFFCC"
| 2009-02-27 || Win ||align=left| Emad Kadycar || Casino Estoril - Spaceboxing || Estoril, Portugal || Decision || 3 || 3:00
|-
|-  bgcolor="#FFBBBB"
| 2008-09-20 || Loss ||align=left| Denis Schneidmiller || S-Cup Europe 2008, Semi Final || Gorinchem, Netherlands || Decision || 3 || 3:00
|-
|-  bgcolor="#CCFFCC"
| 2008-09-20 || Win ||align=left| Joakim Karlsson || S-Cup Europe 2008, Quarter Final || Gorinchem, Netherlands || Decision || 3 || 3:00
|-
|-  bgcolor="#FFBBBB"
| 2008-03-15 || Loss ||align=left| Giorgio Petrosyan || It's Showtime 75 Trophy Final, Super Fight || 's-Hertogenbosch, Netherlands || Decision (Unanimous) || 3 || 3:00
|-
|-  bgcolor="#FFBBBB"
| 2008-01-29 || Loss ||align=left| Gago Drago || Kickboxing Champions League || Lisbon, Portugal || Decision (Split) || 3 || 3:00
|-
|-  bgcolor="#CCFFCC"
| 2007-09-23 || Win ||align=left| Ricardo Fernandes || It's Showtime 75MAX Trophy Portugal, Final || Vilamoura, Portugal || Decision || 3 || 3:00
|-
! style=background:white colspan=9 |
|-
|-  bgcolor="#CCFFCC"
| 2007-09-23 || Win ||align=left| Daniel Gomez || It's Showtime 75MAX Trophy Portugal, Semi Final || Vilamoura, Portugal || Decision || 3 || 3:00
|-
|-  bgcolor="#CCFFCC"
| 2007-09-23 || Win ||align=left| Fabrizio Donato || It's Showtime 75MAX Trophy Portugal, Quarter Final || Vilamoura, Portugal || Decision || 3 || 3:00
|-
|-  bgcolor="#FFBBBB"
| 2007-04-05 || Loss ||align=left| Yohan Lidon || Steko's Fight Night 24, 3rd Place || Pforzheim, Germany || Decision (Unanimous) || 3 || 3:00
|-
|-  bgcolor="#FFBBBB"
| 2007-04-05 || Loss ||align=left| Marco Piqué || Steko's Fight Night 24, Semi Finals || Pforzheim, Germany || Decision (Unanimous) || 3 || 3:00
|-
|-  bgcolor="#CCFFCC"
| 2006-06-31 || Win ||align=left| Ricardo Fernandes || K-1 MAX Portugal 2006, Final || Lisbon, Portugal || Ext.R TKO || 4 || 2:00
|-
! style=background:white colspan=9 |
|-
|-  bgcolor="#CCFFCC"
| 2006-06-31 || Win ||align=left| Mohamed Diaby || K-1 MAX Portugal 2006, Semi Final || Lisbon, Portugal || Decision (Unanimous) || 3 || 3:00 
|-
|-  bgcolor="#CCFFCC"
| 2006-06-31 || Win ||align=left| Jose Barradas || K-1 MAX Portugal 2006, Quarter Final || Lisbon, Portugal || Decision (Unanimous) || 3 || 3:00 
|-
|-  bgcolor="#c5d2ea"
| 2006-06-17 || Draw ||align=left| Abraham Roqueñi || Apocalipsis I || Bilbao, Spain || Decision || 5 || 2:00
|-
|-  bgcolor="#FFBBBB"
| 2005-11-19 || Loss ||align=left| Chris van Venrooij || SuperLeague Portugal 2005 || Carcavelos, Portugal || Decision (Unanimous) || 3 || 3:00
|-
|-  bgcolor="#FFBBBB"
| 2005-09-24 || Loss ||align=left| Petr Polak || SuperLeague Turkey 2005, Reserve Fight || Istanbul, Turkey || Decision || 3 || 3:00
|-
|-  bgcolor="#FFBBBB"
| 2004-12-18 || Loss ||align=left| Abraham Roqueñi || K-1 MAX Spain 2004, Final || Guadalajara, Spain || Decision || 3 || 3:00
|-
! style=background:white colspan=9 |
|-
|-  bgcolor="#CCFFCC"
| 2004-12-18 || Win ||align=left| Ruben Diaz || K-1 MAX Spain 2004, Semi Final || Guadalajara, Spain || TKO || || 
|-
|-  bgcolor="#CCFFCC"
| 2004-12-18 || Win ||align=left| Joakim Karlsson || K-1 MAX Spain 2004, Quarter Final || Guadalajara, Spain || TKO (Corner Stop) || || 
|-
|-  bgcolor="#FFBBBB"
| 2004-04-02 || Loss ||align=left| José Reis || K-1 MAX Portugal 2004, Semi Final || Lisbon, Portugal || TKO || 2 || 
|-
! style=background:white colspan=9 |
|-
|-
| colspan=9 | Legend:

See also 
List of K-1 events
List of It's Showtime events
List of K-1 champions
List of It's Showtime champions
List of male kickboxers

References

1980 births
Living people
Portuguese male kickboxers
Cape Verdean male kickboxers
Middleweight kickboxers
Welterweight kickboxers
Portuguese people of Cape Verdean descent